The 2005 Princeton Tigers football team was an American football team that represented Princeton University during the 2005 NCAA Division I-AA football season. Princeton tied for second in the Ivy League.

In their sixth year under head coach Roger Hughes, the Tigers compiled a 7–3 record and outscored opponents 245 to 163. Ben Brielmaier and Justin Stull were the team captains.

Princeton's 5–2 conference tied with Harvard for second in the Ivy League standings. The Tigers outscored Ivy opponents 192 to 109.

The Tigers played their home games at Princeton Stadium, on the university campus in Princeton, New Jersey.

Schedule

Roster

References

Princeton
Princeton Tigers football seasons
Princeton Tigers football